The 2022 CS Ice Challenge was held on November 9–13, 2022 in Graz, Austria. It was part of the 2022–23 ISU Challenger Series. Medals were awarded in the disciplines of men's singles, women's singles, and ice dance.

Entries 
The International Skating Union published the list of entries on October 19, 2022.

Changes to preliminary assignments

Results

Men

Women

Ice dance

References 

2022 in figure skating
CS
CS